The Vilcabamba brushfinch (Atlapetes terborghi) is a species of bird in the family Passerellidae.

It is endemic to humid Andean forest in the Cordillera Vilcabamba in northwestern Cuzco, Peru. It is sometimes considered a subspecies of the rufous-naped brushfinch.

References

Vilcabamba brush finch
Endemic birds of Peru
Birds of the Peruvian Andes
Vilcabamba brush finch
Taxonomy articles created by Polbot